Mills Cemetery is a small historic cemetery in rural Little River County, Arkansas. It is one of the oldest cemeteries in the county, holding the graves of members of the Mills family, who first explored the Little River County area in the 1850s. The oldest of the 39 known graves dates to the 1850s; one of the most prominent burials is Joel Mills (1808–71), who was a major plantation owner.

The cemetery was listed on the National Register of Historic Places in 2007.

See also
National Register of Historic Places listings in Little River County, Arkansas

References

External links
 

Cemeteries on the National Register of Historic Places in Arkansas
Buildings and structures completed in 1855
Buildings and structures in Little River County, Arkansas
National Register of Historic Places in Little River County, Arkansas
Cemeteries established in the 1850s